Phoenicanthus is a genus of flowering plants belonging to the family Annonaceae.

Its native range is Sri Lanka.

Species:

Phoenicanthus coriacea 
Phoenicanthus obliquus

References

Annonaceae
Annonaceae genera